The 1959 AFC Youth Championship was held in Kuala Lumpur, Federation of Malaya. It was the first time the tournament was organised.

Teams
The following teams entered the tournament:

 
 
 
 
  (host)

Group Allocations
Four winners moved to group A and played for the championship. Five other teams moved to consolation group B. Philippines and Thailand had to play in a preliminary round.

Preliminary Match in 18 and 19 April

|}

Main allocation matches

|}

Consolation Group B

Championship Group A

A closing match was played on 26 April between South Korea and a team composed of the best players from the other eight teams: South Korea won 3-2.

External links
Results by RSSSF

AFC U-19 Championship
1959 in Asian football
1959 in Malayan sport
International association football competitions hosted by Malaysia
1959 in youth association football